Jack Komboy (born 18 April 1977 in Jayapura, Papua) is a former Indonesian footballer, he normally plays as a defender and his height 180 cm. Before he played for PSM Makassar, he played for Persipura Jayapura from 1998 to 2002 and he went back again to Persipura from 2005 until 2010. After retired as a footballer, he became a member of Provincial People's Representative Council (DPRP) in Papua.

Achievements

With Persipura Jayapura
Winning Liga Indonesia Premier Division (2005), Persipura win 3-2 from Persija Jakarta in final match
Runner-up Piala Indonesia (2006)

External links

 liga-indonesia.co.id
 

1977 births
Living people
Papuan people
Indonesian footballers
Indonesia international footballers
People from Jayapura
Persipura Jayapura players
PSM Makassar players
Liga 1 (Indonesia) players
Association football defenders
Sportspeople from Papua